The S. H. Kress and Co. Building at 1442 Main Street in Sarasota, Florida, United States is a historic building. It was part of the S. H. Kress & Co. "five and dime" department store chain. On March 22, 1984, it was added to the U.S. National Register of Historic Places.

Gallery

See also
 National Register of Historic Places listings in Florida

References

External links
 Sarasota County listings at National Register of Historic Places
 Florida's Office of Cultural and Historical Programs
 Sarasota County listings at Florida's Office of Cultural and Historical Programs
 S.H. Kress Building

National Register of Historic Places in Sarasota County, Florida
S. H. Kress & Co.
Buildings and structures in Sarasota, Florida
1932 establishments in Florida
Commercial buildings completed in 1932